The Southern California School Band and Orchestra Association (SCSBOA) provides a number of services for elementary through college level instrumental music groups in Southern California, including providing clinics for educators and students and hosting festivals for soloists and ensembles, including marching band competitions.

Honor ensembles 
The SCSBOA honor groups for elementary through high school students are prestigious music groups which students audition for. They include the band, string orchestra, full orchestra, and jazz band. Students accepted into the groups often demonstrate their expertise in their instruments as well as their motivation to take music to a higher degree. Numerous new musical works have been commissioned for these honor groups over the years to include Double Helix which was published by CPP Belwin.

Festivals 
The festivals run by the organization rate groups on how well they play. Each group plays three prepared pieces and then sightreads a piece that is one level below those they prepared. For many school's music groups, these festivals are long-awaited and practiced for.

Field band 
The field band competitions are an extensive number of parade and field show competitions. SCSBOA Adjudicators are selected based on their prior experience in competition with their own groups, and are peers to the directors of the competing groups.

Parade competitions are typically hosted by cities or communities, but may be hosted by a school band. Specialized parades, called Band Reviews, consist of a parade of only bands and possibly led by a few dignitaries in automobiles. Parade Bands are judged in the categories of Band, Drill Team, Auxiliary, and Drum Major. Parades and Band Reviews may classify competing bands based on total school enrollment, size of the band, or by ranking of the band's scores from competitions in the previous season. The method of classification is determined by the event chairman.

The SCSBOA field show circuit is the most popular in Southern California. Field show competitions are typically hosted by a high school band, inviting other schools to attend. Although there is no rule, hosts at SCSBOA field show competitions typically do not compete in their own competition. Field show bands are judged in the categories of Band, Percussion, and Auxiliary, assigned a Classification based on the total number of musicians performing. Many bands strive to be selected for the SCSBOA Field Show Championships, held the mid-November of each year. Throughout the season, the bands are scored and the 12 top-scoring bands in each class, based on the total of their top three scores of the season, are eligible to compete in SCSBOA Field Championships.

Past field band champions 
Below is an incomplete list of class champions:

External links

References 

Southern California
Music of Los Angeles